The 2nd Golden Melody Awards ceremony was held at the Sun Yat-sen Memorial Hall in Taipei, on 27 October 1990.

References

External links
  2nd Golden Melody Awards nominees
  2nd Golden Melody Awards winners

Golden Melody Awards
Golden Melody Awards
Golden Melody Awards
Golden Melody Awards